Thap Sakae railway station is a railway station located in Thap Sakae Subdistrict, Thap Sakae District, Prachuap Khiri Khan.

Train services 
 Rapid No. 169/170 Bangkok-Yala-Bangkok
 Rapid No. 177/178 Thon Buri-Lang Suan-Thon Buri
 Rapid No. 174 Nakhon Si Thammarat-Bangkok
 Ordinary No. 254/255 Lang Suan-Thon Buri-Lang Suana

References 
 
 

Railway stations in Thailand